Schuler is a surname.

Schuler may also refer to:

 Schuler, Alberta, Canada
 Schuler Books & Music, a bookstore chain in Michigan, US
 Schuler Group, a German industrial machine manufacturer
 Hans Schuler Studio and Residence, a historic site in Baltimore, Maryland, US
 Schuler Homes, an American homebuilding company acquired by D. R. Horton